Miłosz Wałach (born 23 November 2001) is a Polish handball player for Torus Wybrzeże Gdańsk and the Polish national team.

References

2001 births
Living people
People from Jarosław County
Vive Kielce players
Polish male handball players